ØMNI is the ninth full-length studio album by Brazilian progressive/power metal band Angra and the first album by the band with guitarist Marcelo Barbosa (known for his work with Almah) replacing Kiko Loureiro, who left the band to join Megadeth. It was elected the 2nd best metal album of 2018 by the traditional Japanese heavy metal magazine Burrn!.

Track listing
All lyrics are written by Rafael Bittencourt.

Personnel 
Angra
 Fabio Lione - vocals 
 Rafael Bittencourt - guitars, vocals on "The Bottom of My Soul"
 Marcelo Barbosa - guitars
 Felipe Andreoli - bass
 Bruno Valverde - drums

Guest appearances
 Sandy Lima - vocals on "Black Widow's Web"
 Alissa White-Gluz - vocals on "Black Widow's Web"
 Kiko Loureiro - guitar solo on "War Horns"

Production
 Jens Bogren - production, recording

Charts

References

External links

Angra (band) albums
2018 albums
Albums produced by Jens Bogren